Sierracapnia is a genus of small winter stoneflies in the family Capniidae. There are about seven described species in Sierracapnia.

Species
These seven species belong to the genus Sierracapnia:
 Sierracapnia barberi (Claassen, 1924)
 Sierracapnia hornigi (Baumann & Sheldon, 1984)
 Sierracapnia mono (Nelson & Baumann, 1987)
 Sierracapnia palomar (Nelson & Baumann, 1987)
 Sierracapnia shepardi (Nelson & Baumann, 1987)
 Sierracapnia washoe Bottorff & Baumann, 2015
 Sierracapnia yosemite (Nelson & Baumann, 1987)

References

Further reading

 
 

Plecoptera